Dyndylishki (Belarusian: Дындылішкі, Dyndyliški; Russian: Дындылишки; Polish: Dyndyliszki) is a village in Belarus, in the Iwye Raion of Grodno Region.

History 
In the interwar period, the village was situated in Poland, in the Nowogródek Voivodeship, in the Lida County, in the Iwye Commune. After the Soviet invasion of Poland in 1939, the village became part of the BSSR. In the years 1941-1944 it was under German occupation. Then the village was again in the BSSR. From 1991 in the Republic of Belarus. Until 2017, the village was part of the Moryna village.

On June 24, 1944, during the march towards the Naliboki Forest, an improvised grouping of the Home Army, code-named "Bagatelka", commanded by Maj. Maciej Kalenkiewicz "Kotwicz" (soldiers of the 1st Battalion of the 77th Infantry Regiment of the Home Army) with German units stationed in Iwye. Home Army troops were attacked by the Germans as a result of denunciation. According to Kazimierz Krajewski, 8 Polish partisans were killed in the battle at Dyndylishki. They were: boatswain. Wacław Hamera "Gryf", Jan Panasiewicz "Cichy", Michał Zdanowicz "Zefir", Cpl. "Zagłoba" and other unknown soldiers.

The burial place of the fallen Home Army soldiers is located by the road in the village. The tomb was devastated in 2022.

References

Villages in Belarus